Indrani Dutta is an Indian actress and dancer who is known for her work in Bengali cinema. Recipient of a BFJA Award, Dutta shot to fame in 1990s.

Early life
Dutta was born in Kolkata. She is the youngest child of Dr. Himangshu Jyoti Dutta and Manjushree Dutta. Even as a child while studying in Kamala Girls' High School, She nurtured an ambition to become an actress. Her versatility was reflected in dance and sports. She acquired formal training in dance and music and was a sports topper in her school. Among her favourite hobbies were listening to music and stamp collecting. Dutta became graduate in arts from the Sivanath Sastri College, an affiliated college of the prestigious University of Calcutta. Under the able guidance of her Guru Sumitra Mitra, She was conferred Pravakar in Kathak dance by Allahabad University. Her artistic inclinations are reflected in her love for music, interior design and gardening. Her easygoing, down-to-earth, loving nature makes her popular among all age groups. She is also a responsible citizen and environmentalist; with a love for animals, she is an active supporter of the cause of People for Animals.

Filmography

Television works
Indrani's career as an actor is not confined to the big screen. Her performances in telefilms such as Thir Bijuri, Thager Ghar, Swet Mayur, Hatat Bristi and in serials such as Chira Kumar Sabha, Sesh Prasno, Sima Rekha and Louha Kapat is praiseworthy.

In 1997, Indrani acted in the episode Necklace for the Hindi TV series Byomkesh Bakshi as Uma (credited as Indrani Dutt).

Indrani Dutta Kala Niketan
Indrani has a great passion for dance; this passion led her to create her own dance school in Kolkata. Before opening this dance school, she had also had her own dance troupe, named "Srishti". Indrani Dutta Kala Niketan is now a popular and a remarkable dance institution of Kolkata and is well known all over East India. The dance troupe and the dance school have presented many shows in India and overseas.

Mahisasurmardini
Indrani Dutta played the role of goddess Durga twice on the television show named Mahisasurmardini aired on ETV Bangla on 2005 and Star Ananda on 2010. Both of the programs have the same name; both were aired in different years and in different styles.

Jibon Saathi
Indrani Dutta is currently playing the role of Shalankara Banerjee  on the television show named Jibon Saathi aired on Zee Bangla since 2020. Shalankara Banerjee is the mother of the leading male protagonist, Sankalpa Banerjee.

Awards
She won the Bengal Film Journalists' Association Best Actress award for Prabhat Roy's Shedin Choitromaash.

References

External links
 

Actresses from Kolkata
Indian film actresses
Living people
Sivanath Sastri College alumni
University of Calcutta alumni
Year of birth missing (living people)
Actresses in Bengali cinema